The Gersten Pavilion is a 3,900-seat multi-purpose arena in Los Angeles, California. It is the home of the Loyola Marymount University Lions. It was built in 1981 and has been used for home games by the university's men's basketball, women's basketball, and volleyball teams since January 1982. 

It was also the part-time practice home for the Los Angeles Lakers. It was the site for the weightlifting competition for the 1984 Summer Olympics. On March 4, 1990, LMU star Hank Gathers died during a West Coast Conference men's basketball tournament game from cardiomyopathy. The tourney was promptly suspended and LMU was awarded the NCAA bid based on their regular season title. The facility also hosted the WCC tournament in 1997.

The arena is known among LMU alumni as "Hank's House" in honor of Gathers and the phrase "This is Hank's House" is recited before the start of every men's basketball game.

See also
 List of NCAA Division I basketball arenas

References

External links
LMU Gersten Pavilion page 

College basketball venues in the United States
Loyola Marymount Lions men's basketball
Loyola Marymount Lions women's basketball
Loyola Marymount Lions men's volleyball
Loyola Marymount Lions women's volleyball
Basketball venues in Los Angeles
Venues of the 1984 Summer Olympics
Olympic weightlifting venues
Westchester, Los Angeles
College volleyball venues in the United States
Volleyball venues in Los Angeles
1981 establishments in California
Sports venues completed in 1981